Protentomon michiganense is a species of proturan in the family Protentomidae. It is found in North America.

References

Protura
Articles created by Qbugbot
Animals described in 1976